A commodity currency is a currency that co-moves with the world prices of primary commodity products, due to these countries' heavy dependency on the export of certain raw materials for income. Commodity currencies are most prevalent in developing countries (eg. Burundi, Tanzania, Papua New Guinea). In the foreign exchange market, commodity currencies generally refer to the New Zealand dollar, Norwegian krone, South African rand, Brazilian real, Russian ruble and the Chilean peso. Commodity currencies' nature can allow foreign exchange traders to more accurately gauge a currency's value, and predict movements within markets based on the perceived value of the correlated commodity.

Effects 
Due to the nature of commodity currencies being tied to commodities, being tied to any one good can be beneficial as well as problematic for the country. While falling or rising exports will lead to deflation or inflation respectively in any country, the impacts are more severe in countries with commodity currencies, as their currencies are so heavily tied to a set few commodities.

Positive 
According to a 2009 study on commodity currency titled "Can Exchange Rates Forecast Commodity Prices?" by Yu-Chin Chen, Kenneth Rogoff and Barbara Rossi, exchange rates of commodity currencies can predict future global commodity prices. This is hugely beneficial for economists and policymakers who want a reliable measure of future commodity prices.

A currency that is naturally tied to a country’s major commodities can be beneficial if global demand for a commodity increases, naturally strengthening the value of the currency. As seen in Figure 1, as the demand for a commodity shifts out (higher demand) the price increases to p’. This increased demand also is likely to increase GDP, as more exports take place as demonstrated by the equation for GDP below.

As exports increase due to higher demand, GDP will also increase greatly as this country relies heavily on this commodity, leading to higher prices causing inflation (indicated in Figure 2’s increase in the price level). Depending on whether the inflation is economically beneficial, this could be positive (see Inflation).

It is important to note that while countries with commodity currencies benefit from higher demand, countries that import this commodity face the opposite effects.

Negative 
On the other side, a currency being tied to the major commodities of a country can be problematic, as a decrease in demand for any specific commodity can take a huge toll on the country's currency, leading to deflation.

As seen in Figure 3, as the demand for a commodity shifts in (less demand) the quantity decreases to q’. This decreased demand is likely to decrease GDP, as less exporting takes place, as demonstrated by the equation for GDP below.

Similar to the reasoning in the previous section, as seen in Figure 4, a decrease in GDP leads to deflation. This can have negative or positive effects, depending on whether the nation's currency was overvalued or undervalued. Deflation can either be positive or negative in the long run as suggested by the effects section of the deflation article.

It is important to note that while countries with commodity currencies benefit from higher demand of a commodity, countries that import this commodity face the opposite effects.

Externalities 
Most commodities that are tied to currencies are natural resources such as gold, oil, timber and other minerals. However, the mining of these raw resources can lead to immense externalities such as pollution. Countries whose currencies do not hinge on commodity price movements are generally more willing to minimize harmful environmental processes, thus reducing affiliated externalities.

Countries whose currencies are impacted profoundly by commodities are generally less willing to tighten their environmental policies which would reduce externalities. For example, the Canadian dollar is closely tied to soybeans and oil. The production of oil is extremely harmful to the environment.  However, reducing oil production through cap-and-trade programs or production taxes can be devastating to the Canadian dollar.

See also
 Gold standard
 Silver standard
 Hard currency
 Private currency
 Representative money
 Reserve currency
 Commodity money

References

External links
IMF's study on commodity currencies
Do Terms of Trade Drive Real Exchange Rates? Comparing Oil and Commodity currencies

Currency
Commodities